"The Free Electric Band" is a song written by Albert Hammond and Mike Hazlewood and performed by Hammond.  The song reached #19 on the UK Singles Chart, #11 in South Africa and #48 on the U.S. Billboard Hot 100 in 1973.  The song appeared on his 1973 album, The Free Electric Band and was produced by Hammond and arranged by Michael Omartian.

Charts

Other recordings
Lalla Hansson recorded the song in Swedish, as "Han gav upp alltihop (för att spela med sitt band)".

References

1973 singles
Songs written by Albert Hammond
Songs written by Mike Hazlewood
Albert Hammond songs
Lalla Hansson songs
1973 songs
Fictional musical groups